The shooting competition at the 2005 Mediterranean Games was held in the Mediterranean Games Shooting Centre in Almería, Spain.

Medallists

Men's competition

Women's competition

Medal table

References
Results

Sports at the 2005 Mediterranean Games
Mediterranean Games
Shooting at the Mediterranean Games